Michail Asen (c. 1322–1355) was the eldest son of Ivan Alexander of Bulgaria from his marriage with Theodora of Wallachia.

After his father acceded to the throne in 1331, the young prince was proclaimed co-Emperor. He was to succeed his father under the name Michael IV Asen. The heir to the throne was the pride of the royal family and was said to possess "all virtues". He married Maria, renamed Irina, the daughter of Andronikos III Palaiologos.

In 1354–1355 the Ottoman Turks invaded Bulgaria and headed towards Plovdiv and Sofia. It is mentioned in an anonymous Bulgarian chronicle that Michail Asen gathered the Bulgarians and engaged the Turks near Sofia. The Bulgarians were defeated and suffered heavy casualties including Michail himself. But the battle was not in vain: the Ottomans failed to capture the cities and did not attack the country up to 1370. In the Bulgarian folklore is mentioned that the son of the Emperor perished with the death of the brave.

References

Sources 

 

Bulgarian princes
1322 births
1355 deaths
14th-century Bulgarian people
Medieval Bulgarian military personnel
Sratsimir dynasty
Bulgarian military personnel killed in action
Sons of emperors